William Buzy is a French writer born in 1989 and based in Liverpool.

Books
After four essays on journalism published between 2010 and 2016, he published his first novel, Ponos, in 2017.

In 2018, his book of reports called Impact(s) was very well received by critics, especially in the journalistic community.

Between 2018 and 2020, he published books on Cuba, Rojava, Marinaleda, as well as a book of investigations on strong societal issues. The French television channel France 2 refers to a "fascinating and relevant" work, while Canal+ emphasizes "a fresh breath, an inspiration for those who have the desire to get out of asphyxiating situations."

In 2021, he published his second novel, "And green and blue go together so well".

Journalism
Involved in the independent media community, William Buzy has participated in the launch of several media, and has directed documentaries, two of which have been selected in festivals.

His work on impact journalism is referenced in several academic works and books on the subject.

References 

1989 births
21st-century French journalists
Journalists from Liverpool
Living people